Bridge in Greenwood Township was an historic Pratt through truss bridge located in Bells Landing, Clearfield County, Pennsylvania, United States.  It was built in 1892 by the King Bridge Company.

It was listed on the National Register of Historic Places in 1988. It is now torn down and replaced with a modern bridge.

References

See also 
 National Register of Historic Places listings in Clearfield County, Pennsylvania

Road bridges on the National Register of Historic Places in Pennsylvania
Bridges completed in 1892
Transportation buildings and structures in Clearfield County, Pennsylvania
National Register of Historic Places in Clearfield County, Pennsylvania
Pratt truss bridges in the United States
Metal bridges in the United States